Richard John Hatton  (born 6 October 1978) is a British former professional boxer who competed between 1997 and 2012, and has since worked as a boxing promoter and trainer. During his boxing career he held multiple world championships at light-welterweight and one at welterweight. BoxRec ranks Hatton as the 11th greatest European boxer of all time and 5th greatest British boxer of all time, pound for pound. In 2005 he was named Fighter of the Year by The Ring magazine, the Boxing Writers Association of America, and ESPN.

In 2000, Hatton won the British light-welterweight title, followed by the World Boxing Union (WBU) title the following year; he made a record fifteen successful defences of the latter from 2001 to 2004. He reached the pinnacle of his career in 2005 by defeating Kostya Tszyu for the International Boxing Federation (IBF), Ring and lineal titles. This was followed up later that year with a victory over Carlos Maussa to claim the World Boxing Association (WBA) title (Super version), thereby becoming a unified light-welterweight world champion.

Making his welterweight debut in 2006, Hatton won a tough fight against WBA champion Luis Collazo to win a world title in his second weight class. A return to light-welterweight in 2007 saw him win the vacant IBF title for a second time, as well as the International Boxing Organization (IBO) title. In the same year, Hatton had his career first defeat against Floyd Mayweather Jr. in an attempt to win the World Boxing Council (WBC), Ring and lineal welterweight titles. This defeat took a severe toll on Hatton's wellbeing, as did a second defeat in 2009 when he lost his IBO, Ring and lineal light-welterweight titles to Manny Pacquiao.

After Hatton's career was put on a long hiatus, rumours of a comeback continued to circulate the media over the next several years. In 2011, Hatton announced his retirement from the sport, but in 2012, more than three years after his last fight, he confirmed his comeback. A loss to Vyacheslav Senchenko in his first match back prompted Hatton to immediately announce his final retirement.

Hatton has been lauded as one of the most beloved and popular British boxers of all time, with a raucous fan base that travelled in their tens of thousands across the Atlantic to support him.

Early years
Born in Stockport, Hatton was raised on the Hattersley council estate in Hyde, Greater Manchester and trained at the Sale West ABC (Racecourse Estate). He was educated at Hattersley High School. His grandfather and his father both played Football for Rochdale and Hatton had a trial for the youth team. He found a local boxing club in Hyde to train at. His entrance music is the Manchester City club song "Blue Moon", as performed by the band "Supra." Aged 14, Hatton was taken by his uncles Ged and Paul to Manchester United's Old Trafford stadium to watch the second fight between Nigel Benn and Chris Eubank. He joined the family carpet business on leaving school, but after he cut four of his fingers with a Stanley knife, his father made him a salesman to prevent him from losing his fingers.

Amateur career
Hatton had a short amateur career, in which he won seven British titles and represented his country at the 1996 AIBA Youth World Boxing Championships. His elimination in the semi-finals caused controversy. Four of the five judges awarded the contest to Hatton, but under the scoring rules Hatton was defeated as the fifth judge gave the match to Hatton's opponent by 16 points. The judge was later found to have accepted a bribe, and disillusioned with the amateur governing bodies, Hatton  turned professional, aged 18. Hatton was based at Billy "The Preacher" Graham's gym in Moss Side, where fellow boxers included Carl Thompson and Michael Gomez.

Amateur highlights
ABA national junior champion (class C) – light-welterweight (1994)
ABA national junior champion (class A) – light-welterweight (1995, 1996)
ABA national junior champion (class B) – light-welterweight (1997)
ABA national champion – light-welterweight (1997)

Professional career

Light-welterweight

Early career 
Hatton made his professional debut on 11 September 1997 against Colin McAuley in Widnes at Kingsway Leisure Centre. Hatton won by a technical knockout (TKO) in first round, while in his second fight he boxed at Madison Square Garden in New York, as part of the undercard to Naseem Hamed vs. Kevin Kelley. Soon he was fighting on the undercard of contests involving major British boxers, such as the two WBO cruiserweight title fights between Carl Thompson and Chris Eubank in 1998. In 1999 the British Boxing Writers' Club named Hatton their Young Boxer of the Year. His first international title came in May 1999, when he defeated Dillon Carew for the WBO inter-continental light-welterweight title.

Hatton's next four fights after gaining the WBO inter-continental belt were all won within four rounds. He then gained the WBA Inter-Continental title following a unification bout against Giuseppe Lauri. The following month he fought Jon Thaxton for the vacant British title. Despite sustaining a cut over his left eye in the first round, Hatton continued for the full twelve rounds and won on points, the first time in his career that he had been taken beyond six rounds. As the cut was his fourth above the same eye, Hatton had plastic surgery on his eyebrow that November, with a view to a world title shot in the spring. Hatton claimed the vacant WBU title in March 2001, having sent opponent Tony Pep to the canvas three times in the process.

Hatton vs. Tszyu

On 5 June 2005, Hatton defeated IBF and The Ring champion Kostya Tszyu, then widely regarded as one of the top pound-for-pound boxers in the world by a TKO after the Australian failed to answer the bell for the twelfth round. Hatton was a heavy underdog for this fight and the victory announced his entry to the upper echelons of the world boxing scene. Prior to the fight, the majority of boxing critics had given Hatton little or no chance and this victory was regarded as one of the best victories by an English boxer in the last 20 years.

Light Welterweight Unification
On 26 November 2005, Hatton won the WBA light-welterweight title when he defeated Carlos Maussa in the ninth round of a unification bout. In December, Hatton was named the 2005 Ring Magazine Fighter of the Year.

Hatton relinquished his IBF title on 29 March 2006 after refusing to fulfil a mandatory defence against number one contender Naoufel Ben Rabah because he intended to move up to the welterweight division. Hatton signed a three-fight contract with Dennis Hobson's fight academy after splitting from long time promoter Frank Warren. The three fights would take place in the United States.

Welterweight

Hatton vs. Collazo
Hatton moved up a division to meet American Luis Collazo for the WBA welterweight title which took place on 13 May 2006. Hatton won the WBA title from Collazo but struggled. Hatton started well, knocking Collazo down in the very first few seconds of the first round, but it turned out to be one of the toughest fights of his career, with some boxing analysts claiming Collazo won the fight, although many thought Hatton had done enough early on to secure victory, with the knockdown a pivotal point in the fight.

Return to light-welterweight

Hatton vs. Urango
Hatton's first fight back at light-welterweight was against then IBF light-welterweight champion Juan Urango for his title and the vacant IBO title on 20 January 2007 in Las Vegas, Nevada. Hatton's promoter, Dennis Hobson, stated that the impetus for moving back down was to set up a fight with José Luis Castillo, a fighter who nearly beat Floyd Mayweather Jr. at lightweight in 2002.
Hatton ended up winning a twelve-round unanimous decision (UD) against Urango to re-capture the IBF light-welterweight title. He won all but one round on all three judges' scorecards. Castillo, who was on the undercard, also won, setting up their long-awaited fight.

Hatton vs. Castillo
Hatton was forced to relinquish his IBF title again on 10 February to be able to fight Castillo. The fight was held on 23 June 2007, at the Thomas & Mack Center in Paradise, Nevada. In round four, Hatton landed a "perfect" left hook to the liver, which put Castillo to the canvas. Hatton later claimed that four of Castillo's ribs were broken with this one punch. Unable to stand up, Castillo was counted out for the first time in his career.

Return to welterweight

Hatton vs. Mayweather Jr.

Hatton agreed to terms on 27 July for an 8 December 2007 welterweight fight with Floyd Mayweather Jr. which was considered to be the biggest welterweight fight since the 1999 clash between Oscar De La Hoya and Puerto Rican legend Tito Trinidad. The MGM Grand Garden Arena in Las Vegas was announced as the venue on 17 August 2007. The fight was agreed to less than three months after Mayweather had said he planned to retire following a victory over Oscar De La Hoya. Hatton was able to bring the fight to Mayweather in the early rounds. In the 1st round, Hatton caught Mayweather with a left jab which knocked Mayweather off balance. His constant pressure appeared to make Mayweather uncomfortable at first. In the third round, Mayweather landed a right that cut Hatton above the right eye. In round six, referee Joe Cortez took a point away from Hatton after he appeared to hit Mayweather on the back of the head while Mayweather was rested between the ropes. However, the punch was revealed to have hit the rope rather than Mayweather's head, but Hatton was warned for punching behind the head on numerous occasions before the deduction. Hatton became angry at the referee's decision to deduct a point and turned his back on him. Hatton later claimed he was angered by the referee, which caused him to lose his calm and contributed to his downfall. Hatton was able to hold his own until round eight, when Mayweather began to adapt to Hatton and started counterattacking. Mayweather knocked Hatton down to the mat in round ten. Hatton got up, but Mayweather quickly resumed his attack, resulting in Joe Cortez putting a stop to the fight and Hatton's corner threw in the towel. Official scorecards read 88–82, 89–81, and 89–81 at the time of stoppage, all in favour of Mayweather. The fight received large amounts of publicity, with both fighters promoting the fight heavily.

Second return to light-welterweight

Hatton vs. Lazcano

On 24 May 2008, Hatton beat Mexican Juan Lazcano by UD with scores of 120–110, 118–110, and 120–108, in front of his home crowd of 55,000 (a post-World War II record for a boxing match in Britain), at City of Manchester Stadium to retain The Ring and IBO light-welterweight titles.
Hatton did well when he boxed and controlled the range, utilising his jab and dominating a lot of the early exchanges. In round eight, Hatton absorbed a left hook to the chin that wobbled him. In round ten, Hatton was hurt again by a left hook. Despite that, Hatton outworked Lazcano to win at least ten of the rounds.

Hatton vs. Malignaggi

Hatton fought Paulie Malignaggi of the United States at the MGM Grand Garden Arena on 22 November 2008 for Hatton's The Ring light-welterweight title. He was trained for the fight by Floyd Mayweather Sr. Hatton dominated for all of the fight and defeated Malignaggi by eleventh-round TKO when Malignaggi's trainer, Buddy McGirt, threw in the towel 48 seconds into the round.

Hatton vs. Pacquiao

Hatton fought Manny Pacquiao on 2 May 2009 at the MGM Grand Garden Arena in Las Vegas. The fight was at light-welterweight, which was the sixth weight category Pacquiao has fought at and is the weight at which Hatton was previously undefeated. Pacquiao defeated Hatton in the second round by a KO victory after knocking Hatton down twice in the first round, and then a final time in the second round. Following the loss to Pacquiao, Hatton put his career on hiatus. After more than a year out of action, in a June 2010 interview with Gulfnews.com, the British boxer seemed uninterested in coming to the ring again. He stated: "Boxing started off as a habit and it ended up giving me some money and making me a little bit of a better person. But I don't think I will have a fight again. But you can never say never as I have not announced officially that I won't be boxing. At the moment I don't have any fire in the belly for a fight or to get myself to a gym." However, Hatton also added: "But it has been only 13 months and I am only 31, so never count me out."

Hatton has also voiced suspicion that Pacquiao may be using performance-enhancing drugs (PEDs). Hatton said he should have made the same blood testing demand as Floyd Mayweather Jr., whose fight against Pacquiao fell through in early 2010. However, the Nevada Athletic Commission (NAC) cited a medical analysis which supported Pacquiao's decision to abstain from blood testing similar to that demanded by Mayweather, stating that drawing blood close to a fight may cause "hematomas, infections or other injuries." Hatton also admitted that he underestimated Pacquiao and that "it could be that he is just a great fighter who has improved."

Final comeback at welterweight

Hatton vs. Senchenko
On 14 September 2012, Hatton confirmed he would return to professional boxing with a fight against an unnamed opponent scheduled to take place in November that year. Tickets for the comeback sold out in two days, before the opponent or undercard were announced. His opponent was later revealed to be Vyacheslav Senchenko. Having reached a maximum weight of nearly 15 stone (95 kg), in the months leading up to his comeback, Hatton's bodyweight decreased by nearly half his fighting weight.

Hatton started the fight the stronger of the pair, but did not time his shots well. Senchenko used his superior reach to land jabs, and gained the upper hand as the fight progressed. In the ninth round, a left hook to the body sent Hatton to the floor. Knocked down by the type of punch previously viewed as his own signature, Hatton was counted out by the referee. It was the third time Hatton had been stopped, taking his overall record to 45 wins and 3 defeats. He announced his final retirement from the ring immediately afterwards, saying "I needed one more fight to see if I had still got it – and I haven't. I found out tonight it isn't there no more."

Outside the ring
 
Hatton is a passionate supporter of Manchester City, with strong links to the club via his father and grandfather, who are both former players. Hatton also once had a trial at City for the youth team. His entrance music was the club's song "Blue Moon" as performed by the band "Supra".

Regarding his nickname, Hatton said, "I've always been a fan of Tommy Hearns, and everybody associates that that's where I got it from, but everybody's a Tommy Hearns fan. I got the nickname the first day I walked in the gym. I was 10 years old and put a pair of gloves on and started walloping the bag, and my amateur coach said, "Look at him, look how evil he is. He's a little Hitman."

Hatton is sometimes referred to by boxing fans as "Ricky Fatton" because he was known to allow himself to weigh as much as 175 to 180 pounds (35 to 40 pounds over his fight weight) when not in training for a fight. Ever since Hatton turned professional, he always opted to eat a full English breakfast before fights – his favourite place in Hyde is The Butty Box in Mottram Road, where he was interviewed by Gaby Logan for Inside Sport; and is known to drink Guinness on Thursday night when he plays darts for the New Inn. Experts used his ill-balanced diet, akin to Jake LaMotta's ballooning up between fights, to explain his poor performances in later fights and his nature to tire towards the end of fights. Hatton appeared on ITV1's daytime show Loose Women in August 2007, stating that the reason he put on weight between fights was because "I have a lot on my plate at the moment."

Hatton appeared on the Friday Night with Jonathan Ross show in March 2007. When the host, Ross, placed some pads on his hands and gave Hatton gloves to hit them with, he knocked a pad clean off Ross's hand with a powerful left hook. Interviewed on ITV1's Parkinson on 13 October 2007, at the beginning of the interview, Hatton handed Michael Parkinson a custom made pair of boxing shorts with 'Mike' and 'Parky' written on them. The shorts had the Barnsley emblem on them and were coloured red and blue, Barnsley Football Club's colours, because Parkinson supports Barnsley. While talking about Floyd Mayweather's arrogance, Hatton said "if there was such a thing as re-incarnation, Floyd would come back as himself."

Hatton received the MBE for services to sport in the 2007 New Year Honours.

In 2008, he started hosting his own live chat show called Ricky Speaks, on Nuts TV.
His father, Ray Hatton, said, "We had a conversation with a third party asking whether, if we were approached by the Mayweather team, would a possible rematch be on the cards." Ray Hatton added, "Really, at the moment we're looking at Manny Pacquiao. It's very nice for Ricky to still be in such a big league."

Although negotiations stalled at some points, Hatton fought the number one pound-for-pound fighter, Manny Pacquiao, on 2 May 2009.

Hatton hosted the 9 November 2009 edition of WWE Raw at the Sheffield Arena, defeating professional wrestler Chavo Guerrero in a match.

On 13 September 2010, Hatton was admitted to a rehabilitation facility, The Priory, in Roehampton, London, England, for substance abuse to tackle a drink and depression problem. He was caught on camera apparently snorting class A drugs, lines of cocaine, in a Manchester hotel room. Doctors said they were more worried about his depression and alcohol abuse than drug use. Hatton sought medical help two weeks prior after news emerged about a night out where he drank 11 pints of Guinness, vodka and sambuca during the night out with Emma Bowe, 29, the Irish national senior women's boxing champion.

Family
Hatton's mother, Carol, still works on the carpet stall on Glossop Market in the Peak District. His father Ray was his manager, and manages Hatton's brother and fellow boxer Matthew Hatton. Hatton and his girlfriend, Jennifer Dooley, lived in his house, the "Heartbreak Hotel", named after his favourite artist, Elvis, in Hyde.

Hatton has a son, Campbell, conceived after a short reconciliation with ex-girlfriend Claire. Hatton set up a trust fund to make sure his son was always provided for and sees him every day. Campbell has followed in the footsteps of his father, Ricky, by pursuing a career in professional boxing. He is currently trained by Ricky's brother, Matthew Hatton.

On 12 September 2010, the Sunday tabloid News of the World published a front-page story alleging Hatton has been a regular cocaine user with accompanying pictures showing the boxer apparently using the drug. Hatton was said to be "devastated" following the story.

Charity
Hatton is a supporter of The Village News, Haughton Green's local children's newspaper made by children in aid of charity. Hatton supported them at a charity auction by appearing and signing boxing gloves, with the evening raising £1,600. Hatton was also recently a special guest speaker for The Toby Henderson Trust at a sportsmans' dinner at the Gosforth Marriott Hotel. Thanks to Hatton's help via donations and a highly successful auction, a lot of money was raised for the Centre for First Initiatives in Crosby Liverpool.

In 2013, Hatton became the patron of Manchester-based homeless charity Barnabus.

Fans
Hatton has attracted many fans who were very vocal in their support during fights. The main chant was a modified version of the Christmas song "Winter Wonderland", with the lyrics changed to promote Hatton.

Hatton fans also liked to taunt opponents by singing "Who Are Ya?", a popular English football chant. Along with Floyd Mayweather, Hatton is referenced by New York rapper GZA on the track "Paper Plate" of his 2008 album, Pro Tools.

Hatton Promotions

Hatton has his own boxing promotions that has boxers Anthony Upton, Sonny Upton, Paul Upton, Lucas Browne, Cameron Hammond, Damien Hooper, Zhanat Zhakiyanov, Adam Etches, Matty Askin, Scott Jenkins Sergey Rabchenko and Ryan Burnett. On 11 February 2017 Zhanat Zhakiyanov became the first fighter under Hatton Promotions, as well as trained by Hatton, to become world champion when he defeated Rau'shee Warren by split decision (SD) to win the WBA bantamweight title.

Training career
Hatton is a boxing manager and trainer. He is the trainer of Nathan Gorman, the great nephew of Bartley Gorman King of Gypsies, Zhanat Zhakiyanov as well as Irish champion Paul Upton. Hatton is also the trainer of Tommy Fury, the younger brother of Tyson Fury, and was in the corner of Tyson for his fight against Deontay Wilder in 2018.

Professional boxing record

Exhibition boxing record

Pay-per-view bouts

See also
List of boxing families#Hatton family

References

External links

1978 births
Living people
British boxing promoters
English autobiographers
English male boxers
Illeists
International Boxing Federation champions
Members of the Order of the British Empire
People from Hyde, Greater Manchester
Sportspeople from Stockport
World Boxing Association champions
International Boxing Organization champions
The Ring (magazine) champions
World light-welterweight boxing champions
World welterweight boxing champions
British Boxing Board of Control champions